Kevin John Hogarth (10 February 1934 – 11 February 2022) was a boxer from  Australia. He competed for Australia in the 1956 Summer Olympics held in Melbourne, Australia, in the welterweight event where he finished in third place.

References
Sports-reference

1934 births
Olympic boxers of Australia
Olympic bronze medalists for Australia
Boxers at the 1956 Summer Olympics
Living people
Olympic medalists in boxing
Australian male boxers
Medalists at the 1956 Summer Olympics
Welterweight boxers